Thiri Thu Myatswa Yadana Dewi (born Ma Phwar; 1833 – 1875), commonly known as the Princess of Hlaing or Hlaing Hteik Khaung Tin, was a crown princess of Burma during the late Konbaung dynasty.

She was a poet and musician as well as being known for her beauty. She created a style of popular song known as the bawle and wrote court dramas such as Vijayakārī and Indavaṃsa.

Early life 
Ma Phwar was born in 1833 to the future King Tharrawaddy and Anauk Nanmadaw Ma Mya Lay. When her father ascended the throne, her mother became the Queen of the Western Palace, and Phwar was granted the appanage of Hlaing. She then became known as the Princess of Hlaing. At the Rajabiseka Consecration of her father in 1840, she received the title of Thiri Thu Myatswa Yadana Dewi from him.

She was said to have inherited her artistic skill from her mother, who was also a poet. When Anauk Nanmadaw Ma Mya Lay was executed by King Tharrawaddy in 1845, their daughter was adopted by Setkya Dewi, who later became the Chief Queen of King Mindon.

Later years 
The Princess of Hlaing married Crown Prince Kanaung on 11 July 1853, at the age of 20, and gave birth to a son known as the Prince of Htantabin. Her husband was assassinated during the unsuccessful Myingun Myinkhondaing rebellion of 1866, and her son was executed in 1878. She died on 31 December 1875.

Art

Bawle and patpyoe 
The Princess of Hlaing is regarded as the first composer of a kind of plaintive song known as the bawle. Popular bawles include "Seinchu Kya-nyaung", "Naga Saddan" and "Pandusela". She also composed a type of classical music set to drums called the patpyoe. "Yayyamone", a combination of three traditional lullabies, is her best known patpyoe.

Court drama 
The Princess of Hlaing wrote two court dramas: Vijayakārī and Indavaṃsa. The full script of Vijayakārī is no longer available; only the fourth volume has survived.

References

See also 
 Konbaung dynasty
 List of Burmese consorts

1833 births
1875 deaths
Burmese Buddhists
Queens consort of Konbaung dynasty
Konbaung dynasty
19th-century Burmese poets